Glond is an archaic name given to two different species of plants:

Cowherb, Vaccaria hispanica, a flowering plant in the pink family used in Chinese traditional medicine
Awlwort, Subularia aquatica, an aquatic plant in the mustard family

See also
 Gland